Nelly Marshall (after marriage, McAfee; pseudonym, Sans Souci; May 8, 1845 – April 19, 1898) was a 19th-century American "southland" author of novels and verse. In her day, Marshall was perhaps one of the most popular writers in the South and West. In her first ten years of writing, she probably wrote more than any woman of her age in the United States. In addition to numerous poems and magazine articles, she published two volumes of verse, entitled A Bunch of Violets, and Leaves From the Book of My Heart. Her novels included Eleanor Morton, or Life in Dixie (1865); Sodom Apples (1866); Fireside Gleamings (1866); Dead Under the Roses (1867); Wearing the Cross (1868); As by Fire (1869); Passion, or Bartered and Sold (1876); and A Criminal Through Love (1882).

Early life and education
Nelly Nichol Marshall was born in Louisville, Kentucky, May 8, 1845. She was the daughter of Gen. Humphrey Marshall, who was distinguished as a statesman, diplomat, lawyer, and soldier; and Frances E. (McAllister) Marshall.

Her education, which had been conducted with singular care and advantage, was interrupted by the vicissitudes of the civil war around her Henry County home.
 From her earliest childhood, Marshall’s intellectual development was remarkable, and her first compositions, which included the crudities that mark the early efforts of all young writers, foretold that mental power and strength which later won for her so many admirers.

Career
In 1863, when but eighteen years of age, she embarked upon a literary career, becoming a regular contributor to magazines and newspapers, her verse and short-stories bringing her a wide reputation. Her Kentucky home, "Beechland" had been devastated by the civil war, compelling her to write for the press, and devoting herself to literary pursuits.

Marshall's first volume was published in 1866, Gleanings from Fireside Fancies, by "Sans Souci". As By Fire, a novel, published in New York in 1869, was successful, giving promise of future success. It was described as a tale "of passion-life, earnest, intense, and full of pathos", and although the critics praised, the also stated it was "slightly overwrought". Other volumes included, A Bunch of Violets; Leaves from the Book of My Heart; Eleanor Morton : or, Life in Dixie (1866); Sodom Apples (1866); Dead under the Roses (1867); Wearing the Cross (1868); Passion : or, Bartered and Sold (1876); and A Criminal through Love (1882). Besides these, she published several volumes on miscellaneous subjects, and contributed to magazines and newspapers many serials, essays, letters, sketches, and poems. Many of her poems are marked by tender touches of pathos and passion.

Personal life
In 1862, during the civil war, Marshall made her way through the Southern lines, to nurse a wounded brother, and soon after, met the Confederate officer, Capt. John J. McAfee. For years, her parents opposed that Marhsall would marry McAfee. In 1869, McAfee began serving his first of two terms as the representative of Mercer County, Kentucky in the Kentucky legislature. By 1870, she was pursuing a literary career in New York City. Consent to the marriage was at last given by her parents, and the wedding day was scheduled for the spring of 1871. But in January of that year, McAfee was stricken with typhoid pneumonia. Despairing for his fiance, he sent for her and the wedding ceremony took place at Frankfort on February 13, 1871, in the presence of only five witnesses, the bride being given away by the nearest friend of both parties, Col. James Quilbert Chenoweth, senator from the Mercer district. After the wedding, they lived in Frankfort. On one occasion, Marshall was occupying her husband's seat in his absence, when a vote was taken. She voted in his place, and amidst general hilarity, her vote was recorded.

She died in Washington, D.C., April 19, 1898.

Publications
 A Bunch of Violets
 Leaves From the Book of My Heart
 Eleanor Morton, or Life in Dixie (New York City, 1865)
 Sodom Apples (1866)
 Fireside Gleamings (Chicago, 1866)
 Dead Under the Roses (1867)
 Wearing the Cross (Cincinnati, 1868)
 As by Fire (New York, 1869)
 Passion, or Bartered and Sold (Louisville, 1876)
 A Criminal Through Love (Louisville, 1882)

Notes

References

Attribution

Sources
 

1844 births
1898 deaths
19th-century American writers
19th-century American women writers
19th-century pseudonymous writers
Writers from Louisville, Kentucky
Pseudonymous women writers